Below is a list of football players who have gained full international caps whilst contracted (permanently) to Sheffield Wednesday F.C. The caps column only shows caps won while with Sheffield Wednesday - caps won while with other clubs are not shown.

Key

Algeria

Belgium

Benin

DR Congo

Curaçao

Czech Republic

England

Finland

Guinea

Iceland

Republic of Ireland

Jamaica

Kosovo

Macedonia

Netherlands

Northern Ireland

Norway

Portugal

Romania

Scotland

Slovenia

Sweden

USA

Wales

Yugoslavia

References

Internationals
Forest
Shef
Association football player non-biographical articles
Sheffield W